The moss-backed sparrow (Arremon dorbignii), also known as the stripe-crowned sparrow, is a species of bird in the family Passerellidae, the New World sparrows. It is found in South America from central Bolivia to northwestern Argentina.

Taxonomy and systematics

The moss-backed sparrow was formerly considered a subspecies of saffron-billed sparrow (Arremon flavirostris). In January 2021, both the South American Classification Committee (SACC) of the American Ornithological Society (AOS) and the International Ornithological Congress (IOC) elevated it to species status.

Description

The adult male moss-backed sparrow's head is mostly black, with a white supercilium from the lores to the back of the head and a narrow gray streak on the crown. The neck is gray and the back, wings, and tail are dull olive green. Its underside is white with grayish edges and a narrow black band across the upper chest. The adult female is similar but duller overall. The crown strip is olive and the underparts are buffy with brown flanks. Juveniles are similar to the adults but duller. The moss-backed sparrow shares the "striking orange bill" of its former "parent" saffron-billed sparrow. Six specimens from Argentina had a mean weight of

Distribution and habitat

The moss-backed sparrow is found in Bolivia from La Paz, Cochabamba, and Santa Cruz Departments into northwest Argentina as far south as Catamarca Province.

The moss-backed sparrow is primarily inhabits tropical deciduous forest, both primary and second-growth. It is also often found near forest edges, interior openings, and along waterways.

Behavior

Feeding

Though the moss-backed sparrow's diet is not well known, it does include fruit, grain, and insects.

Breeding

The moss-backed sparrow nests from October into December. The mean clutch size is 2.8 eggs and the female does all the incubation. Both sexes feed nestilings.

Status

The IUCN has assessed the moss-backed sparrow as of Least Concern. Though its population has not been determined, it appears to be stable with no known substantial threats. The species is described as "fairly common".

References 

Arremon
Birds of Argentina
Birds of Bolivia
Birds described in 1856
Taxa named by Philip Sclater